Longgu (Logu) is a Southeast Solomonic language of Guadalcanal, but originally from Malaita.

Phonology 
Phonology is concerned with the ways in which languages make use of sounds to distinguish words from each other. In Longgu, there are both consonants and vowels which make up its alphabet. Altogether, it has five distinct vowel articulations and nineteen consonant phonemes. According to the usual custom in the languages of Guadalcanal, the vowels are sounded out separately.

Consonants 
In Longgu, the consonant phonemes include:

In Longgu, there are four voiceless stops including glottal stops. All of Longgu's voiceless stops are not aspirated, while its three voiced stops are pre-nasalised. Prenasalization of voiced stops is also recurrent in Longgu, whereby it is more audible intervocalically. Furthermore, the labial stop /bw/ is also recognised as a voiced stop /b/. For example:

 Babasu and Bwabwasu (name of a town) are both acceptable.

In this language, there are four fricatives, but in particular we can look at the dental fricative /z/ which has been recorded. Additionally, a voiceless interdental has been previously recorded for Longgu. An example of this is θae, meaning ‘liver' in English. Furthermore, when the consonants /s/ and /z/ are produced, the tip of the tongue is touching the back of the bottom teeth, with the blade touching the palate. Below shows a minimal pair which demonstrates these two different consonants:

 bisi “place to go to the toilet”
 bizi “so (as in se bizi “not so (much)”)

In addition to consonants for Longgu, the labial consonants /bw/ and /mw/ are portrayed as individual phonemes as opposed to two separate phonemes, such as /b/ and /w/ or /m/ and /w/ as there are no other transformations of a consonant that is followed by a glide (i.e. */dw/ and */gw/). Therefore, it has been found that there are no consonant clusters in Longgu, hence an analysis of two separate phonemes rather than a unit phoneme is required.

Vowels 
The vowel phonemes in Longgu are:

In Longgu, any pair of vowels may occur in a vowel sequence. Vowel sequences are treated as two separate vowels based on their behaviour in terms of stress rules and reduplication. Below are two examples of minimal pairs which demonstrate a contrast in vowel sequences:

The high back vowel, which is in this case /u/ is interpreted as a glide[w] before /i/ or /a/. Furthermore, there appears to be no long vowels in Longgu, however all of its vowels may produce vowel sequences. In Longgu, a vowel sequence cannot be broken for the purposes of reduplication.

Phonotactics 
The overall syllable structure of Longgu is (C)V(V), which means that the order of sentence structure will be; consonant, verb and then vowel. All of its consonants either occur before the word or in the middle, however a few of these consonants are known to occur in particular environments. For example, /z/ will tend to occur only before /a/ and /u/. This syllable structure does not apply to two independent pronouns, such as; ngaia 3rd person singular, and gaoa 1st person dual inclusive. The stress on both of these pronouns is on the first syllable (nga-ia and ga-oa). Furthermore, voiced stops may only occur in the same morpheme as another voiced stop if both are identical or made at the same place of articulation. For example:

 dede-a ‘fill it’
 gege ‘beside’

It is important to note that this rule does not necessarily apply across all morphemic boundaries as, for example, a possessive suffix that is attached to a noun may include a voiced stop that is made at a different place of articulation. For example:

 gege-da ‘beside them’

Reduplication 
Any vowel, including a geminate vowel (a reduplicated vowel which emphasises the meaning) can occur with any other vowel within the same syllable. In terms of consonants, labial consonants /pw/, /bw/ and /mw/ only occur before non-rounded vowels. See the examples below:

 bwabwa ‘hole, cave’
 mwatawa ‘ocean’
 pwakepwake ‘boar’

There is both partial and full reduplication that is present in Longgu. In terms of partial reduplication, the first syllable of a word containing two syllables is reduplicated:

 la-loto ‘swimming’
 zua-zuala ‘standing’
 mau-mauru ‘sleeping’

It is important to note here that words of two or more syllables are always partially reduplicated through the reduplication of the first two syllables:

 tavurake ‘to leave’
 tavu-tavurake ‘leaving’

Stress 
Stress occurs when a level of emphasis or prominence is given to a phonological word. Primary stress will be on the main syllable, whilst the secondary stress will be on every alternate preceding syllable. Stress in most oceanic languages will indeed fall on this penultimate syllable. A phonological word can consist of a base word, such as a noun or verb, and all of its affixes. For instance, the word zato “sunny” tends to be nominalised through a singular noun phrase clitic:

 záto “sunny”
 záto-i “sun”

Orthography 
In Longgu, certain orthographic conventions can be used. It is important to realise that the labialised bilabial phonemes in Longgu can essentially be written as pw, bw and mw, the bilabial fricative / β/ as v, the glottal stop /ʔ/ as /’/ and the velar nasal /ŋ/ as digraph /ng/. Apart from these exceptions, all the other consonants are written in their phoneme form.

Pronouns and Person Markers

There are four pronominal forms in Longgu:

 independent pronouns
 subject pronouns
 possessive suffixes
 object suffixes

Independent pronouns and subject pronouns in Longgu are closed word classes. Possessive suffixes are attached to nouns to form inalienable possessive constructions, and object suffixes are attached to transitive verbs. Four numbers are distinguished in pronominal forms: singular, dual, paucal, and plural, and non-singular first person pronouns are either inclusive (INCL) or exclusive (EXCL).

Independent pronouns 

Independent pronouns can act as subject pronouns for 1st and 2nd person non-singular. They also mark agreement between the verbs and its object for 2nd and 3rd person non-singular object suffixes. When an independent pronoun functions as the head of a noun phrase, the noun phrase may consist of the head alone (example 1), may include the pronominal article (example 2), the cardinal or ordinal numeral expressing "one", a post head modifier, or a noun phrase clitic. All third person pronouns can function as determiners, but the 3rd person plural pronoun gira and 3rd person singular pronoun ngaia are the ones that are most commonly used to fulfill this function.

The first person dual inclusive pronoun gaoa has the reduced form ga. The first person singular pronoun na is used instead of nau when placed before the irrealis particle ho.

Independent pronouns have three functions:
 Nominal argument of a clause

 Possessor in an alienable possessive construction

 Determiner in a noun phrase

Subject pronouns 

The subject pronoun is also the first constituent of a verb phrase, and is used to cross-reference the number and person of the subject noun phrase. Lonngu does not have any 1st and 2nd person non-singular subject pronouns, as can be seen in Table 2. Third person non singular subject noun phrases are either fully cross-referenced for person and number by the subject pronoun (example 6), or by the 3rd person plural subject pronoun (example 7).

Using the 3rd person plural subject pronoun to cross-reference dual and paucal subject noun phrases is thought to be a simplifying device, and used when the number of the subject has already been established either by a subject noun phrase, an independent pronoun (example 7), or a subject pronoun in a previous clause (example 8). The third person plural subject pronoun can be used to cross reference both inanimate and animate subjects.

The use of 3rd person plural subject pronoun as a cross-referencing device is often associated with the repetition of an event as seen in example 8.

Subject pronouns are given in Table 2, with independent pronouns functioning as subject pronouns placed in brackets.

Possessive suffixes 
Possessive suffixes are bound morphemes that are either attached to nouns or to the nominal preposition ta-,.

Possessive suffixes have five functions:

 To signify the whole of a part/ whole relationship

 To express the relationship between a local noun and the dependent common/ place noun

 To signify the possessor in an inalienable possessive construction

 To signify the object of a nominal or dative preposition

 To refer to the object of a small class of verbs

Object suffixes 

Object suffixes are attached to transitive verbs to cross-reference person and number of the object pronoun phrase argument in transitive clauses. The person and number of object noun phrases with animate references are fully marked by the object suffix on the verbs (example 14). Object suffixes in Longgu make distinctions between inanimate and animate objects, as well as distinguishing between objects which are highly individuated, and those that have no special importance.

A list of object suffixes are shown in Table 3, and independent pronouns functioning as object suffixes are placed in brackets.

For third person plural object suffixes, inanimate objects can be referred to using both -ra and -i, but animate objects are referred to using only the object suffix -ra.

Singular objects are marked by 3rd person singular suffix -a.

Non-singular objects can be marked by the 3rd person singular suffix -a, as well as the 3rd person plural suffix -ra and the 3rd person plural inanimate suffix -i. However, the 3rd person singular suffix can only be used when the object is not highly individuated (example 16). The taro tops in example 16 refers to taro tops in general, not a specific group that the speaker had in mind.

The 3rd person plural inanimate suffix -i cross references dual, paucal, or plural inanimate objects which are highly individuated. In example 17, the head noun is quantified, and food objects are also cross-referenced by the 3rd person plural inanimate suffix.

Possession
Possession in grammar is a construction which expresses a relationship between a possessor and a possessum [what is possessed]. There are two key syntactic constructions for possession: alienable and inalienable. Inalienable possession refers to the relationship between a person/being and its inherent properties or parts, and which cannot be removed. In contrast, alienable possession refers to a relationship of possession where the possessum (thing being possessed) can be given away or lost by the possessor.  Both types of possessive construction may express kin relationships, part/whole relationships (body and its parts), objects, location and ownership but to varying degrees and with certain allowances and limitations.
NB: All examples in Possession are taken from Longgu Grammar by Deborah Hill, 2011 unless otherwise stated.

Inalienable Possession
Inalienable possession in Longgu is expressed by a possessive pronoun. There are two sets of possessive pronouns within inalienable possession: those referring to food that is eaten or intended to be eaten; and those which express ownership of all other things.
Inalienable possessive constructions are formed by directly suffixing a possessive suffix to a head noun [the possessum], followed by the dependent noun [possessor]. It can be a common noun (which can in turn be possessed) or an independent pronoun. Some nouns in Longgu may only form the head of an inalienable possessive construction and not alienable. These include: Certain kin terms; local nouns; noun ve’ete- (‘self’); certain nouns referring to personal possessions; nouns expressing the relationship between a whole and its parts; nouns which refer to concepts that are inherently connected to a person (e.g. A person's name, shadow, ancestors); nominalised verbs.

Inalienable possessive constructions express a number of different types of relations and they can be split into several sub-categories:

 Possessive suffixes
 Kin relationships
 Body part relationships
 Spatial relationships
 Personal possession
 Part/whole relationships
 Possessive pronouns referring specifically to food and possessions

Possessive Suffix 

For example:

Possessive constructions can also be recursive, meaning that up to three possessive noun phrases may be in the one sentence.

[*head N + poss. suff. ... head N +poss  
bou(head) + na	...gale 	+ gu]

Kin Relationships 

Only certain kinship terms may be inalienable in Longgu. These include bound nouns such as: Barunga-na (‘his/her spouse’), Si-na (‘his/her younger sibling’), iiva-na (‘his/her brother/sister in-law’); and Vavune-na  (‘his/her cross-sibling’), vungau-na  (‘his/her parent/child in-law’) which may both be used vocatively.
Not strictly kinship terms, boro “old man” and mwaro “old woman” can formulate a semi-verbal predicate. The possessor (rather than possessum) is marked by a suffix (–na) so there is no need for a noun to follow.
 Boro-na 	“his/her old man/ancestor”
 Mwaro-na 	“his/her old woman/ancestor”

Body part relationships 

Most body part terms form the head of inalienable possessive constructions:

^may denote either the fluid or the body part.

The inalienable possessive construction is the unmarked possessive construction for primary body parts (parts seen as belonging to the whole body, as opposed to non-primary body parts, which are seen as belonging to a section/part of the body). 
Note: when the body parts become separated from the whole they are thus treated as alienable (see Alienable: kinship)

Spatial Relationships 

Local (denoting location) nouns can act as the head of an inalienable possessive construction but not an alienable. As well as denoting possession, local nouns can also appear in their bare form and/or in associative constructions. 

Places within the house are also place nouns and as such can form the head of inalienable possession:

Personal Possession 

There are a select few common nouns which show personal possession in inalienable constructions but not alienable:
 Vuli-na		‘his/her bed’
 Nilau-na		‘his/her decoration’
 Pitapita-na	‘his/her bracelet’
 Va’ava’a-na	‘his/her necklace’
This limited group suggests that there is a semantic basis, that all these items are either worn or slept in. The treatment of these nouns (of personal decoration) as inalienable is consistent even when the possessor is not wearing them, in contrast to ‘clothes’.

Intangible things which aren’t transferable between people are treated as bound to a person.:
 Zata-na ‘his/her name’
 Nun-na ‘his/her shadow’
 Walu-na ‘his/her voice’
 Tatala-na ‘his/her footprint’
 Anoa-na ‘his/her ancestor’s spirit’

Part/Whole Relationships 

Parts/sections of man-made things, natural things such as rivers and hils, and patterns like dances are treated as inalienably possessed. These include:
 Pilasu-na vugi		“banana sprouts (new shoots)”
 Tina-na ‘ai			‘tree trunk’
 Boru-na wai		‘river bed’
 Boru-na iolai		‘underside of canoe’
 Popopo-na mala’u’ui	‘top of the hill’
 Maa-na wai		‘mouth (lit: eye) of the river’
 Sulu-na niui		‘leaf of the coconut tree’
 Uri-uri-na avai		‘dance steps’

Possessive Pronouns referring to food and possession 

Inalienable possessive pronouns are divided into two categories:
 referring to food that is eaten or intended to be eaten by the possessor,
 relating to other possessions, typically found in nominal clauses (eg. That’s mine).

For both sets a suffix a is attached to the 1st and 2nd person singular possessive suffixes.

(a) For referents to food that’s eaten or intended to be the possessive suffix is attached directly to the possessive particle a.

(b) Other possessions, typically found in nominal clauses, are formed by an attachment of possessive suffixes to the particle na

Alienable Possession 
Alienable possession refers to the possession of items (possessums) that may be transferred away or lost by the possessor. They are formed by a head noun and an independent pronoun, which denotes the possessor, and may be followed by a possessed or non-possessed dependent noun.

HEAD NOUN + INDEPENDENT PRONOUN + can be followed by a dependent noun (non-/possessed)

Nouns that can take on an alienable construction include such categories as animals, foods, personal items, villages and some kinship terms.

Longgu development of alienable constructions where the possessor is expressed by a disjunctive pronoun (like nau) is non-standard to the POC.

Kinship Relations 

There is a small set of kinship terms which may be the head of an alienable possessive construction but not inalienable. These are:
 Tia ngaia ‘his/her mother’
 Mama ngaia ‘his/her father’
 vua ngaia ‘his/her grandparent’grandchild’
 sa’i ngaia ‘his sister’s child/his/her mother’s brother’

All of these kinship terms, excluding tia ngaia ‘his/her mother, mother’s sister’, represent reciprocal relationships. In POC, generally terms for mother and father are not included in inalienable possessive constructs, in this Longgu differs. Longgu also deviates from standard POC in that not all reciprocal kinship terms are included in inalienable possessive constructions.

Terms for adopted child and friend are also alienably constructed:

Personal Possession 

Personal possession that can be transferred from one person to another, for example objects, as well as place, like villages.

As noted above, possessive pronouns may be used in inalienable constructions to talk about food that is being eaten/intended to be eaten by the possessor. In alienable constructions the food words themselves can form the head (of only alienable constructions). This includes food that may be intended for eating.

Alienable/Inalienable Possession 
There are a number of nouns which may form either the head of an alienable or inalienable possessive construction, and this is dependent on the semantic relationship between the head and the dependent noun. Sub-categories include: kinship terms, body part terms, other common nouns.

There are only two kinship terms which may form the head of both alienable and inalienable possessive constructions. For gale ‘child’, there is a semantic basis for which form it takes. This is whether the possessor of the child is human or animal. 
 Gale-na mwane		‘the man’s child’
 Gale ngaia ‘usul		‘the dog’s puppy’

The inalienable possessive construction of body part terms is the unmarked variety, however when these become detached/dismembered they are treated as alienable. 
 Kakasa-gu	‘my rib (inside my body)’
 Kakasa nau	‘my rib (that I own, eg. A pig’s rib)’

‘story’, ‘path’, ‘egg’, ‘picture’; ‘canoe’, ‘house’, ‘clothes’. Each have alienable and inalienable distinctions.

Inalienable constructions of ‘story’, ‘path’, ‘egg’, ‘picture’ express that the possessor is the source of the possessum. For example, an egg laid (created) by someone compared with an egg which someone owns.

Associative ni Construction 
Not strictly a possessive construction, the associative ni construction is formed whereby the morpheme –ni is used to join two nouns into a possessive noun phrase. (N1 + ni + N2). 
In Proto-Oceanic there were four distinct constructions for representing nouns possessed by a possessor noun phrase: inalienable/specific possessor; inalienable/non-specific possessor; alienable/specific possessor; alienable/non-specific possessor. Longgu, however, maintains only a three-way distinction, with the differentiation between the two non-specific possessor constructions being lost and ni now used for both.

Negation

Negative particle  
A negative verb phrase is formed by the negative particle se and a predicate head.

The negative particle, se, is a pre-head particle which negates verbal and semi-verbal clauses. The negative particle occurs after the subject pronoun in a verb phrase expressing realis mood, and after the irrealis particle ho (5) in a verb phrase (negative predicate) which expresses irrealis mood.

Negative Quantifiers 
Quantifiers function like numerals. Negative quantifiers include:

The quantifiers bwala “none” may be predicate heads as well as adnominal modifiers.

All quantifiers modify a head noun. The quantifier bwala “none” quantifies nouns which are not marked by noun phrase clitics.

Note: bwala is also a conjunction “or”, which is used to express the disjunctive meaning.

Existential clauses 
Existential clauses in Longgu are formed by verbal, semi-verbal and nominal clauses.

Negative existential clauses are formed by either semi-verbal or nominal clauses. A semi-verbal negative existential clause consists of the quantifier bwala “none, not, no” and a noun as predicate head. It is recognizable as a semi-verbal clause because of the presence of a subject pronoun (9) and aspect particle (10).

A nominal negative existential clause consists of one noun phrase – the predicate. The quantifier bwala “none, no, not” precedes the noun phrase head. Note that (11) is an inalienable possessive construction. The possessum is gale “child” and the dependent possessor is an associative noun phrase. The plural clitic refers to the head of the possessive construction.

General modifiers  
There is also a small closed-class of general modifiers (i.e. those which function as both verbal modifiers (12) and nominal modifiers (13)). The negative general modifier include sodo “nothing”.

Sodo “nothing” is a post-head modifier.

Intensifiers  
The intensifier tahou modifies only verbs. It can be used in comparisons, but it expresses the notion “at all” in negative sentences.

Yes/no questions  
Yes/no questions are structurally similar to declarative sentences. They differ from declarative sentences only by the intonation contour. In declarative sentences there is falling intonation across the sentence. In interrogative sentences the intonation rises and then falls on the last word.

Yes/no questions may include the directional particle hou “thither”. This particle functions to form a more clearly interrogative sentence than an interrogative sentence formed by intonation only.

Yes/no responses (with falling intonation) are: 

To covey doubt about the answer, a speaker uses ii (with rising intonation).

To respond negatively to an identifying question the quantifier bwala “no” is used.

To respond negatively to a response to a question about a state, a verb phrase consisting of the quantifier bwala “no, none” and an aspect particle (either the continuative particle ‘ua or the perfect aspect particle na/na’a) is used (i.e. bwala ’ua “not yet”; bwala na “not now”).

A positive response to yes/no question asking about the identity of something is ee “yes”. A positive response to a yes/no question about the state of something will often repeat the question.

Footnotes

References 
Delahunty, G.P. and Garvey, J.J., 1994. Language, grammar, and communication: A course for teachers of English. McGraw-Hill College.

Hill, D. 2011. Longgu grammar. 1st ed. München: Lincom Europa.

Ivens, W. G. 1934. A Grammar of the Language of Longgu, Guadalcanal, British Solomon Islands. Bulletin of the School of Oriental and African Studies, 7, 601–621.

Lynch, J., Ross, M. and Crowley, T., 2002. The oceanic languages (Vol. 1). Psychology Press.

Ross, M. D. (2004). The morphosyntactic typology of Oceanic languages. LANGUAGE AND LINGUISTICS, 5(2), 491–540.

External links 
 ELAR archive of Telling and Re-telling: documenting Longgu, an Oceanic language of the Solomon Islands
 Materials on Longgu are included in the open access Arthur Capell collection (AC2) held by Paradisec.

Malaita languages